Nathaniel Pendleton (October 27, 1756 – October 20, 1821) was a United States district judge of the United States District Court for the District of Georgia.

Education and career

Born on October 27, 1756, in New Kent County, Colony of Virginia, British America, Pendleton read law. He served in the Continental Army starting in 1775, during the American Revolutionary War, serving as an aide-de-camp to General Nathanael Greene in the campaigns in the southern states. He was in private practice in Savannah, Georgia until 1789. He was Attorney General of Georgia from 1785 to 1786. He was elected as a delegate to the Constitutional Convention of 1787 which drafted the United States Constitution, but did not attend. He was elected to the Congress of the Confederation (Continental Congress) in 1789, but did not attend.

Federal judicial service

He was confirmed by the United States Senate on September 26, 1789, and received his commission the same day. His service terminated on September 1, 1796, due to his resignation.

Later career

Following his resignation from the federal bench, Pendleton resumed private practice in Dutchess County, New York starting in 1796. He was a Judge of the Dutchess County Court until 1821.

Duel

On July 11, 1804, Pendleton served as a second to Alexander Hamilton in Hamilton’s fatal duel with Aaron Burr.

Death

Pendleton died on October 20, 1821, in Hyde Park, New York. He was interred in St. James' Churchyard in Hyde Park.

Family

Pendleton was a nephew of Edmund Pendleton, the 1st Chief Justice of the Supreme Court of Virginia, and cousin of John Penn, a signer of the United States Declaration of Independence and Articles of Confederation from North Carolina. He was the father of Nathanael G. Pendleton, a United States representative from Ohio.

References

Sources

 
 Guide to the Nathaniel Pendleton Papers, 1767-1867

1756 births
1821 deaths
Judges of the United States District Court for the District of Georgia
United States federal judges appointed by George Washington
18th-century American judges
New York (state) state court judges
People from New Kent County, Virginia
People from Hyde Park, New York
Pendleton family
Continental Army officers from Virginia
United States federal judges admitted to the practice of law by reading law
Georgia (U.S. state) Attorneys General